Speyeria egleis, commonly known as the Great Basin fritillary or egleis fritillary, is a butterfly of the family Nymphalidae. It is found in North America, where it has been recorded from North Dakota southwest through Oregon to California and south to Colorado. The habitat consists of mountain meadows, forest openings and exposed rocky ridges.

The wingspan  is 45-60 mm. The wings are bright to dull orange brown with dark markings. Adults are on wing from late June to August.

The larvae feed on the leaves of Viola species, including V. adunca, V. nuttallii, V. purpurea, and V. walteri.

Subspecies
S. e. egleis
S. e. albrighti (Gunder, 1932) (Montana)
S. e. linda (dos Passos & Grey, 1942) (Idaho)
S. e. macdunnoughi (Gunder, 1932) (Montana)
S. e. mattooni J. Emmel & T. Emmel, 1998 (California)
S. e. moecki Hammond & Dornfeld, 1983 (Oregon)
S. e. oweni (Edwards, 1892) (California)
S. e. reidi Austin, 1998 (Nevada)
S. e. secreta dos Passos & Grey, 1945 (Colorado)
S. e. tehachapina (Comstock, 1920) (California)
S. e. toiyabe Howe, 1975 (Nevada)
S. e. utahensis (Skinner, 1919) (Utah)
S. e. yolaboli J. Emmel & T. Emmel, 1998 (California)

S. e. atossa and S. e. clemencei are now treated as subspecies of Speyeria adiaste.

References

Speyeria
Butterflies of North America
Fauna of the Northwestern United States
Butterflies described in 1862